Joseph Leroy Poulter (27 March 1902 – 28 March 1947) was an Australian rules footballer who played for Collingwood and South Melbourne in the Victorian Football League (VFL).

A regular in the Collingwood side of the 1920s, Poulter was a member of their 1927 premiership team and also played in a losing Grand Final in 1926. He finished his career at South Melbourne, whom he crossed to during the 1928 season. In 1930, before returning to South Melbourne for one final season, Poulter had a stint as captain-coach of Brighton. His son Ray was a successful forward for Richmond.

Notes

References
Holmesby, Russell and Main, Jim (2007). The Encyclopedia of AFL Footballers. 7th ed. Melbourne: Bas Publishing.

External links

1902 births
1947 deaths
Australian rules footballers from Melbourne
Australian Rules footballers: place kick exponents
Collingwood Football Club players
Collingwood Football Club Premiership players
Sydney Swans players
Brighton Football Club players
Brighton Football Club coaches
One-time VFL/AFL Premiership players
People from Greensborough, Victoria